The International Human Powered Vehicle Association (IHPVA) is a US-based organization dedicated to promoting the design and development of human powered vehicles (HPVs) and the keeping of speed and distance records for these vehicles and bikes.

History 
In , the IHPVA was reorganised into an international association with national organisations as members and an American association which adopted the name Human Powered Vehicle Association HPVA.

Due to conflicts regarding record keeping and copyrights, the HPVA left the IHPVA in 2004. In , the HPVA renamed itself to IHPVA while the IHPVA of this time decided to keep its name, resulting in a brief period with two organisations of the same name.

In a hostile takeover, the American IHPVA also seized control of the domain name ihpva.org away from the international IHPVA. This tried to regain its domain by appealing to the ICANN's ombudsman but was unsuccessful and in  renamed itself to World Human Powered Vehicle Association (WHPVA).

Members 
Today's IHPVA is an association of individuals from all over the world and has affiliate associations in North America. The affiliates are:

Association des Véhicules à Propulsion Humaine du Québec (aVPHq)
BRAG - Bent Riders of Arizona Group
Chicagoland Recumbent Riders
Easy Riders Recumbent Club (ERRC) - Oregon
Florida, Georgia, and Alabama- Loose Assemblage of SouthEast Recumbent Riders (LASERR)
HPVs of Southern Ontario
Human Powered Vehicle Operators of Ottawa (HPVOoO)
Los Angeles/Orange County Recumbent Riders
Los Angeles Recumbent Riders (LARRs)
Louisville's Relaxed Recumbent Riders' Group
Mars- (Metro Area Recumbent Society) - New Jersey
Michigan HPVA
Minnesota HPVA (MnHPVA)
Bent Trail Riders (BTR) of OHIO
Omaha-Nebraska Country Cruisers
Oregon Human Power Vehicles (OHPV)
Recumbenteers of Western New York
Recumbent Cycling Ontario formally HPVSO
R-BENT, Recumbent-Bike Enthusiasts of North Texas
R-Best (Recumbent - Bicycle Enthusiast of South Texas)
Redwood Empire HPV
Rochester Area Recumbent Enthusiasts (RARE)
San Diego Recumbent Riders
Seattle Area Bike Builders' Group
Washington's Happily Independent Recumbent Lovers (WHIRL)
Wisconsin/Illinois HPV riders (WISIL HPVers)
Wolver-Bents Recumbent Cyclist
League of Michigan Bicyclist Spin-off

IHPVA records 

The IHPVA maintains speed and distance records for various times and distances for land, water and air vehicles.

References

External links 
 ihpva.org - International Human Powered Vehicle Association

Human-powered vehicles
Cycling organizations in the United States